The long-tailed skua or long-tailed jaeger (Stercorarius longicaudus) is a seabird in the skua family Stercorariidae.

Etymology
The word "jaeger" is derived from the German word Jäger, meaning "hunter". The English word "skua" comes from the Faroese name skúgvur  for the great skua, with the island of Skúvoy known for its colony of that bird. The general Faroese term for skuas is kjógvi . The genus name Stercorarius is Latin and means "of dung"; the food disgorged by other birds when pursued by skuas was once thought to be excrement. The specific longicaudus is from Latin longus, "long", and cauda, "tail".

Description

This species is unmistakable as an adult, with grey back, dark primary wing feathers without a white "flash", black cap and very long tail. Adults often hover over their breeding territories. Juveniles are much more problematic, and are difficult to separate from parasitic jaeger over the sea. They are slimmer, longer-winged and more tern-like than that species, but show the same wide range of plumage variation. However, they are usually colder toned than Arctic, with greyer shades, rather than brown.

Subspecies
Two subspecies are described:
 S. l. longicaudus – Vieillot, 1819:  nominate, found in northern Scandinavia and Russia.
 S. l. pallescens – Løppenthin, 1932: found in eastern Siberia, Arctic North America, and Greenland.

Breeding

This species breeds in the high Arctic of Eurasia and North America, with major populations in Russia, Alaska and Canada and smaller populations around the rest of the Arctic. It is a migrant, wintering in the south Atlantic and Pacific. Passage juvenile birds sometimes hunt small prey in ploughed fields or golf-courses, and are typically quite fearless of humans.

They nest on dry tundra or higher fells laying two spotted olive-brown eggs. On the breeding grounds they can be heard making yelping and rattling sounds. Outside of the breeding season they spend most of their time over open ocean and have a harsh kreeah cry. This bird feeds on fish (mainly caught from other seabirds), smaller birds, food scraps, small mammals, fruit and carrion. On migration, long-tailed jaegers are more likely to catch their own food, and less likely to steal from gulls and terns than larger species.

References

External links
 Long-tailed jaeger photos at Oiseaux.net
 
 
 
 
 
 
 

long-tailed jaeger
Birds of the Arctic
Holarctic birds
long-tailed jaeger
long-tailed jaeger